The Centre International de Rencontres Mathématiques (CIRM) is a mathematics research institute associated with the Centre National de la Recherche Scientifique (CNRS) and the Société Mathématique de France (SMF). It is located in Luminy, Marseille, France, and is affiliated with Aix-Marseille University. CIRM hosts weekly workshops on diverse topics where mathematicians and scientists from all over the world come to do collaborative research. Modeled as a "villa Medici of mathematics", it receives around 3,500 visitors per year.

History

In 1954, a report from the CNRS discussed potential sites for a meeting place to hold international seminars and workshops in mathematics similar to the Mathematisches Forschunginstitut Oberwolfach. The Luminy estate, formerly owned by the prominent Fabre shipping family, was chosen in 1976. The estate was handed over to the SMF in 1979. The center opened in 1981 and the first workshop was held in 1982.

Scientific programs
CIRM supports a variety of residential programs and workshops. Each year, CIRM runs around 35 week-long workshops with an average of 75 weekly participants. CIRM also supports joint programs with Société de Mathématiques Appliquées et Industrielles, Institut Henri Poincaré, and Société Mathématique de France.

Jean-Morlet Chair
CIRM hosts the Jean-Morlet Chair, which is a six-month residential program for international researchers to collaborate with a local project leader from Aix-Marseille University to plan events and projects. The chair was named after Jean Morlet, a French geophysicist who worked with Marseille-based researcher Alex Grossmann, among others, to develop the wavelet transform. Past chairs have included Nicola Kistler, Boris Hasselblatt, Igor Shparlinski, Hans Georg Feichtinger, Herwig Hauser, François Lalonde, Dipendra Prasad, Mariusz Lemańczyk, Konstantin Khanin, Shigeki Akiyama, and Genevieve Walsh.

Directors
André Aragnol: June 1981 – August 1986 
Gilles Lachaud: September 1986 – August 1991
Jean-Paul Brasselet: September 1991 – August 1995
Jean-Pierre Labesse: September 1995 – August 2000
Robert Coquereaux: September 2000 – August 2005
Pascal Chossat: September 2005 – August 2010
Patrick Foulon: September 2010 – August 2020
Pascal Hubert: September 2020 – present

References

French National Centre for Scientific Research
Research institutes established in 1981
International research institutes for mathematics
Research institutes in France
Aix-Marseille University
Education in Marseille